The Heart of Saturday Night is the second studio album by singer and songwriter Tom Waits, released on October 15, 1974, on Asylum Records. The title song was written as a tribute to Jack Kerouac. The album marks the start of a decade-long collaboration between Waits and Bones Howe, who produced and engineered all Waits' recordings until the artist left Asylum.

Cover 
The album cover is based on In the Wee Small Hours by Frank Sinatra. It is an illustration featuring a tired Tom Waits being observed by a blonde woman as he exits a neon-lit cocktail lounge late at night. Cal Schenkel was the art director and the cover art was created by Lynn Lascaro.

Critical reception 

In a contemporary review for The Village Voice, Janet Maslin regarded the songs as tawdry affectations of "a boozy vertigo" marred by Waits' vague lyrics and ill-advised puns on an album that is "too self-consciously limited" in mood. "It demands to be listened to after hours", Maslin wrote, "when that cloud of self-pitying gloom has descended and the vino is close at hand". Fellow Village Voice critic Robert Christgau was also critical of Waits' compositions, writing that "there might be as many coverable songs here as there were on his first album if mournful melodies didn't merge into neo imagery in the spindrift dirge of the honky-tonk beatnik night. Dig?"

In a retrospective review for the Los Angeles Times, Buddy Seigal was more impressed by Waits' "touchingly, unashamedly sentimental" songs, calling The Heart of Saturday Night perhaps the singer's most "mature, ingenuous and fully realized" album. It was ranked number 339 on Rolling Stone magazine's list of the 500 greatest albums of all time.

Track listing
All songs written and composed by Tom Waits.

Side one

Side two

Personnel
All personnel credits are as listed in the album's liner notes.

Performer
Tom Waits – vocals, piano, guitar

Musicians
Jim Hughart – double bass
Pete Christlieb – tenor saxophone
Tom Scott - clarinet
Jim Gordon – drums
Bob Alcivar – arranger
Mike Melvoin - "head" arrangements and complementary orchestral arrangements and direction

Technical personnel
Bones Howe – producer, engineer
Geoff Howe – engineer
Pamela Vale - production coordinator 
Terry Dunavan – mastering

Design personnel
Cal Schenkel – art direction
Lynn Lascaro – illustrations
Scott Smith – photography

Certifications

References

Bibliography

External links
 The Heart of Saturday Night at Discogs

1974 albums
Asylum Records albums
Tom Waits albums
Albums produced by Bones Howe